Purcell Knob is a spur of the Blue Ridge Mountain in Loudoun County, Virginia.  The  peak is just northeast of the main ridge at Keyes Gap and southeast of the village of Neersville.

Purcell Knob is notable for exposure of the sericitic phyllite base of the Paleozoic Loudoun Formation in its antiformal syncline.

References

Mountains of Virginia
Mountains of Loudoun County, Virginia
Blue Ridge Mountains